The Black Association for Nationalism Through Unity, or BANTU, was a youth activism group focused on black power and nationalism in Omaha, Nebraska in the 1960s. Its name is a reference to the Bantu peoples of Southern Africa. 

It was reportedly an arm of the Black Panthers Party.  Efforts by some to start a chapter at Tech High School were unsuccessful. According to extensive U.S. government surveillance records, Robert Griffo, a member of the Black Panthers, was appointed minister of student affairs at Tech. BANTU was credited with leading the protests that led to three days of rioting in June 1969, after an Omaha police officer fatally shot teenager Vivian Strong in the Logan Fontenelle Public Housing Projects.

BANTU was also the target of a COINTELPRO investigation by the FBI.

See also 
 List of riots and civil unrest in Omaha, Nebraska
 African Americans in Omaha, Nebraska

References

Bibliography
 Howard, A. M. (2006, Sep) The Omaha Black Panther Party and BANTU: Exploitation or a Relationship of Mutual Convenience  Paper presented at the annual meeting of the Association for the Study of African American Life and History, NA, Atlanta, GA

Politics of Nebraska
African-American history in Omaha, Nebraska
History of North Omaha, Nebraska
Youth empowerment organizations
Organizations based in Omaha, Nebraska
Independence movements
Post–civil rights era in African-American history
COINTELPRO targets
Organizations with year of establishment missing
1960s in Nebraska